The Diocese of San Jose in the Philippines (Lat: Dioecesis Sancti Iosephi in Insulis Philippinis) is a Latin Church ecclesiastical territory or diocese of the Catholic Church in the Philippines.

The diocese was founded in 1984, having previously formed part of the Diocese of Cabanatuan. It is a suffragan of the Archdiocese of Lingayen-Dagupan.

The diocese held its first Diocesan Synod in March 2011 led by the Apostolic Nuncio to the Philippines. The diocese celebrated its Silver Anniversary of Canonical Erection last July 14, 2009. On April 20, Pope Benedict XVI named its third bishop, Mylo Hubert C. Vergara, as the bishop of Pasig. At present, the diocese is headed by its fourth bishop Roberto C. Mallari, former Auxiliary Bishop of the Archdiocese of San Fernando, Pampanga.

History

The Diocese of San Jose, Nueva Ecija, was created on Feb. 16, 1984 by Pope John Paul II and canonically erected on July 14, 1984. Its territory was taken from the Diocese of Cabanatuan which at same time of the division comprised the entire province of Nueva Ecija.

Sixteen parishes, out of forty one  parishes of the Diocese of Cabanatuan were adjudicated to the Diocese of San Jose, Nueva Ecija. 80 percent of the people are Roman Catholics and the rest of 20 percent are members of different sects and denominations.

Bishop Florentino F. Cinense was appointed the diocese's first diocesan bishop on July 14, 1984. When appointed coadjutor bishop of Tarlac, he remained as apostolic administrator of San Jose, until the appointment of his successor Bishop Leo M. Drona on July 25, 1987. Bishop Leo M. Drona had been a Salesian of Don Bosco for twenty nine-years prior to his episcopal appointment. He is the first Filipino Salesian priest as well as the first Filipino Salesian bishop. In June 2004, Drona was transferred to the Diocese of San Pablo, Laguna as its third bishop. He was succeeded by Bishop Mylo Hubert C. Vergara, who was installed as the third bishop of the Diocese of San Jose de Nueva Ecija on May 14, 2005. Then Vergara transferred to the Diocese of Pasig. It was May 15 when Pope Benedict XVI named the current bishop, Roberto C. Mallari.

Ordinaries

Diocesan officials
Vicar General:    Getty A. Ferrer
Chancellor:       Rufo Ramil H. Cruz
Vice Chancellor:  Michael J. Grospe
Oeconomous:       Nestor E. Romano
Judicial Vicar:   Getty A. Ferrer

Apo Jose Catholic Educational System (ACES)

Diocesan schools
Our Lady of the Sacred Heart College, Guimba
St. Joseph School, San Jose City
St. Pius X Institute, Cuyapo
St. Pius X Institute of Nampicuan, Nampicuan
Sacred Heart Academy, Lupao
St. Andrew School, Pantabangan
Holy Family Academy, Quezon
Dominican High School, Santo Domingo
Liceo de Christ the King, Talugtug
St. Nicholas Academy, Carranglan

Religious administered
San Sebastian School, Muñoz

Other educational centers
Don Bosco Training Center, Malasin, San Jose City

See also
Catholic Church in the Philippines
List of Catholic dioceses in the Philippines

References

San Jose in the Philippines
San Jose in the Philippines
Christian organizations established in 1984
Roman Catholic dioceses and prelatures established in the 20th century
1984 establishments in the Philippines
Religion in Nueva Ecija
San Jose, Nueva Ecija